The 46th Tour of Flanders cycling classic was held on Sunday, 1 April 1962. It was won by Belgian Rik Van Looy after an ultimate solo attack in Wetteren. 48 of 151 riders finished.

Route
The race started in Ghent and finished in Gentbrugge for the first time – covering 254 km. The finish was on the Emile Verhaerenlaan, where riders had to finish an additional 2.3 km lap. There were six categorized climbs:

Results

References

Tour of Flanders
1962 in road cycling
1962 in Belgian sport
1962 Super Prestige Pernod